The Păscoaia is a left tributary of the river Lotru in Romania. It flows into the Lotru in the village Păscoaia.

Tributaries

The following rivers are tributaries to the river Păscoaia (from source to mouth):

Left: Pârcălabul, Mândra, Neteda, Pleșoaia, Pietroșița, Pârâul Cloambelor, Purcărețu
Right: Cheia Păscoaia, Valea Ursului, Pietrosu, Pârâul Arsurilor, Pădurețu, Priboiasa, Plăieșu

References

Rivers of Romania
Rivers of Vâlcea County